Δ9-Tetrahydrocannabiorcol (Δ9-THCC, (C1)-Δ9-THC) is a phytocannabinoid found in Cannabis pollen. It is a homologue of THC and THCV with the alkyl side chain replaced by a smaller methyl group. Unlike THC and THCV, THCC has negligible affinity for the CB1 and CB2 cannabinoid receptors because of the smaller methyl group and does not have psychoactive effects as a result, but conversely it is significantly more potent than THC or THCV as an activator of the TRPA1 calcium channel which plays an important role in pain perception, and it has been shown to produce analgesic effects via activation of spinal TRPA1 channels.

See also 
 Abnormal cannabidiol
 O-1602
 O-1918
 Tetrahydrocannabiphorol
 Tetrahydrocannabutol

References 

Benzochromenes
Phytocannabinoids
Oxygen heterocycles
Tricyclic compounds